Dendrobium atroviolaceum (black blood-red dendrobium) is a species of orchid, endemic to eastern Papua New Guinea.

References

atroviolaceum
Orchids of Papua New Guinea
Endemic flora of Papua New Guinea
Plants described in 1890